Family is an upcoming South Korean television series directed by Jang Jeong-do, starring Jang Hyuk, Jang Na-ra, Chae Jung-an, and Kim Nam-hee. It is scheduled for release on tvN on April 17, 2023, and will air every Monday and Tuesday at 20:50 (KST). It is also available for streaming on Disney+ in selected regions.

Synopsis 
Family tells the story of Kwon Do-hoon (Jang Hyuk) who is a NIS black agent husband who disguises himself as an ordinary office worker and Kang Yoo-ra (Jang Na-ra), a sweet and fierce wife who dreams of a perfect family.

Cast

Main 
 Jang Hyuk as Kwon Do-hoon
 Kang Yoo-ra's husband, who is a black agent of the National Intelligence Service who disguises himself as an employee of a trading company.  Although he neglects his family due to his busy schedule, he is a husband who loves his wife more than anyone else. 
 Jang Na-ra as Kang Yoo-ra
 Kwon Do-hoon's wife. After meeting her husband, she created the perfect family she has dreamed of all her life. She is a housekeeper at the highest level who tries to protect her family and hides a secret behind her lovely appearance.
 Chae Jung-an as Oh Chun-ryeon
 A professional NIS operative who is also Do-hoon's immediate senior.
 Kim Nam-hee as Tae-goo
 A suspicious uninvited guest who visited the families of Do-hoon and Yoo-ra.

Supporting 
 Kim Kang-min as Kwon Ji-hoon
 Kwon Do-hoon's youngest brother.
 Lee Soon-jae as Kwon Woong-soo
 Kwon Do-hoon's father.
 Yoon Sang-jeong as Lee Mi-rim
 Kwon Ji-hoon's wife.
Shin Soo-ah as Kwon Min-seo
 Kwon Do-hoon's and Kang Yoo-ra's daughter.
 Gabee as Ma Young-ji

Production 
The series marked the fourth project together between actor Jang Hyuk and actress Jang Na-ra after Successful Story of a Bright Girl (2002), You Are My Destiny (2014) and MBC Drama Festival: Old Goodbye (2014).

References

External links 
  
 
 

TVN (South Korean TV channel) television dramas
Korean-language television shows
Television series by Studio Dragon
2023 South Korean television series debuts
Upcoming television series
South Korean comedy-drama television series